Antología is a compilation album released by Marco Antonio Solís on January 28, 2014.

Disc 1

All songs written and composed by Marco Antonio Solís

Disc 2

All songs written and composed by Marco Antonio Solís

Disc 3

All songs written and composed by Marco Antonio Solís

Disc 4

All songs written and composed by Marco Antonio Solís

DVD

References

2014 compilation albums
Marco Antonio Solís compilation albums